Hattie and the Wild Waves is a 1990 book by Barbara Cooney. It tells the story of Hattie, who "is from a well to do German immigrant family and has a mind of her own." She looks to the ocean to decide what occupation to pursue as she grows up: painting.

The book was described as being the closest to Mrs. Cooney's heart. She narrated an audiobook with this book and her Eleanor .

American picture books
Picture books by Barbara Cooney
1990 children's books
Children's fiction books